Battle of Antietam is a wargame written for the Apple II by Chuck Kroegel and David Landrey and published by Strategic Simulations in 1985.

Gameplay
Battle of Antietam is a game in which the Battle of Antietam is simulated.

Reception
William H. Harrington reviewed the game for Computer Gaming World, and stated that "SSI and the authors have created more than a first rate grand tactical simulation of one of the most critical battles of the Civil War with BOA. They have captured some of the look and 'feel' of Civil War combat, and it shows."

Reviews
Computer Gaming World - Oct, 1990

See also 
 Sid Meier's Antietam!

References

External links
Review in Compute!
Review in Family Computing
Review in Compute!'s Gazette
Review in InCider
Article in Atari Interface

1985 video games
American Civil War video games
Apple II games
Atari 8-bit family games
Video game
Commodore 64 games
Computer wargames
DOS games
Strategic Simulations games
Turn-based strategy video games
Video games developed in the United States
Video games set in Maryland